Arthur Minasy (1925 – 9 May 1994) was an American inventor. His most famous invention was in 1966, when he invented surveillance tags that could be attached to items in stores to prevent shoplifting.

The tag is removed by a cashier once it has been paid for. If the tag is not removed, an alarm is set off when the person leaves the store.

Following the success of this, Minasy set up his own security company, The Knogo Corporation, which has produced numerous other security related items.

Education
Minasy graduated from New York University with an engineering degree in 1949 and a master's degree in industrial engineering in 1952.

See also
Shop lifting

References 

Rachel Shteir's book The Steal, includes quite a few pages about Arthur John Minasy in chapter 3, pages 45–49. 
https://web.archive.org/web/20160304043207/http://www.buckens.com/Knogo/minasyen.htm is an obit for Arthur Minasy

1925 births
1994 deaths
Polytechnic Institute of New York University alumni
20th-century American engineers
American inventors